Irosh Sohan Sithija Samarasooriya (born 3 March 1991) is a Sri Lankan cricketer. He made his first-class debut for Moors Sports Club in the 2010–11 Premier Trophy on 18 February 2011. In 2017, he played for North West Warriors in the 2017 Inter-Provincial Cup.

In April 2018, he was named in Galle's squad for the 2018 Super Provincial One Day Tournament. In August 2018, he was named in Dambulla's squad the 2018 SLC T20 League. On 12 January 2020, he scored an unbeaten 108 from 59 balls for Nugegoda Sports and Welfare Club in the 2019–20 SLC Twenty20 Tournament.

References

External links
 

cricketers]]

1991 births
Living people
Sri Lankan cricketers
Kilinochchi District cricketers
Moors Sports Club cricketers
North West Warriors cricketers
Saracens Sports Club cricketers
Tamil Union Cricket and Athletic Club cricketers
Nugegoda Sports and Welfare Club cricketers
Sportspeople from Galle